Joe Flanagan (3 April 1898 – 7 October 1985) was an Australian rules footballer who played with Melbourne in the Victorian Football League (VFL).

Notes

External links 

 

1898 births
1985 deaths
Australian rules footballers from Victoria (Australia)
Melbourne Football Club players